Echeveria shaviana, called Mexican hens or Mexican hens and chicks, is a species of flowering plant in the family Crassulaceae, native to northeastern Mexico. A succulent, it has gained the Royal Horticultural Society's Award of Garden Merit.

References

shaviana
Endemic flora of Mexico
Flora of Northeastern Mexico
Plants described in 1972